Alla Yefremovna Gerber (born 3 January 1932 in Moscow) is a Russian politician, journalist and film critic.

Life 
In 1955, Alla Gerber graduated from the faculty of law of the Moscow State University. In the following years she worked as a lawyer and a journalist. First, she worked for Moskovskij Komsomolets and was a correspondent of the newspapers Junost (ru), Izvestia, Literaturnaya Gazeta and Moskovskaya Pravda. Since 1963 she has written over 1000 articles and 8 books. She is also a member of the Russian Union of Journalists and former member of the USSR Union of Writers.

Political commitment 
 1989: Co-organizer of the pro-perestroika-writer movement "Aprel" ("Апрель")
 1990: First anti-fascist process in the USSR, with the conviction of a functionary of the ultra-nationalist organization Pamyat "(Russian for "memory") ended
 1991: leading member of the movement "Democratic Russia" and founder of the Moscow Anti-Fascist Centre
 1993: Members of the first State Duma of the Russian Federation in the group “Russia’s choice” ("Выбор России")
 Since 1995: Research fellow of the Institute for the Economy in Transition ("Института экономики переходного периода"), president of the Holocaust Foundation, member of the editorial board of the library "Holocaust" and, among others co-author of "The history of the Holocaust on Soviet territory"
 Since 2007: Member of the Public Chamber of Russia

In the Duma she dealt, among others, with laws in the following areas:
 limiting the privileges of the deputies and state officials
 Governmental and Non-State secondary education
 banning of extremist organizations, hate mongering and National Socialist symbols
 Protection of Museums and Libraries

Awards and honors 
 Laureate of the Prize "Person of the Year 5762" of the Federation of Jewish Communities of Russia

See also 
 Russian Research and Educational Holocaust Center

References

External links 

 Literature by Alla Gerber 

Jewish Russian politicians
Journalists from Moscow
1932 births
Living people
First convocation members of the State Duma (Russian Federation)
Members of the Civic Chamber of the Russian Federation
Russian film critics
Russian women journalists
Russian women critics
20th-century Russian politicians
21st-century Russian politicians
20th-century Russian women politicians
21st-century Russian women politicians